Maksim Yuryevich Putilin (born 11 June 1966) is a Russian former professional footballer.

Career
He made his professional debut in the Soviet Second League in 1984 for FC Torpedo Vladimir. He played 3 games and scored 1 goal in the UEFA Intertoto Cup 1998 for FC Shinnik Yaroslavl.

His son Roman Putilin is a professional footballer.

Honours
 Russian Cup winner: 1993.

References

1966 births
Living people
Soviet footballers
Russian footballers
Association football midfielders
Association football defenders
Russian Premier League players
FC Asmaral Moscow players
FC Torpedo Moscow players
FC Torpedo-2 players
FC Lokomotiv Nizhny Novgorod players
FC Shinnik Yaroslavl players
FC Amkar Perm players
FC Sibir Novosibirsk players
FC Kristall Smolensk players
FC Torpedo Vladimir players